Brandon Collins (born April 21, 1989) was an American football wide receiver who is currently a free agent.

College career
Collins played 2 seasons at the University of Texas before transferring to Southeastern Louisiana University. In 2007, Collins played in 7 games as a freshman and had 2 special teams tackles. As a sophomore at Texas in 2008, he played in 12 games with 3 starts and caught 35 passes for 430 yards and 3 touchdowns. He was academically ineligible for the 2009 season. He was kicked of the Texas team when he was arrested for aggravated robbery.  In 2011, he caught 61 passes for 746 yards and 5 touchdowns. In his first season at Southeastern Louisiana, Collins played in all 11 games with 8 starts and was second on the team with 56 catches for a team-high 875 yards (15.6-yard avg.) and 4 touchdowns. He also returned 13 punts for 88 yards.

Professional career
Collins was signed on May 14, 2012 by the New York Giants. On June 24, 2013, Collins was suspended without pay for the first four games of the 2013 regular season for violating the NFL policy and program regarding substances of abuse. On August 25, 2013, he was cut by the Giants.

In 2015, Collins joined the San Jose SaberCats of the Arena Football League. After making two receptions for 47 yards and a touchdown, Collins was placed on reassignment on June 1, 2015.

On June 2, 2015, Collins was claimed by the Spokane Shock. On June 4, 2015, Collins was traded back to the SaberCats.

With the SaberCats not playing during the 2016 season, Collins was assigned to the Los Angeles KISS.

References

1989 births
Living people
People from Brenham, Texas
Players of American football from Texas
American football wide receivers
Canadian football wide receivers
American players of Canadian football
Texas Longhorns football players
Southeastern Louisiana Lions football players
New York Giants players
San Jose SaberCats players
Spokane Shock players
Los Angeles Kiss players
Baltimore Brigade players
Hamilton Tiger-Cats players